Ewa Grajkowska-Stańko (born October 26, 1948 in Gorzów Wielkopolski) is a Polish sprint canoer who competed in the early 1970s. She finished sixth in the K-2 500 m event at the 1972 Summer Olympics in Munich.

References
Sports-reference.com profile

1948 births
Canoeists at the 1972 Summer Olympics
Living people
Olympic canoeists of Poland
Polish female canoeists
Sportspeople from Gorzów Wielkopolski